The 7th Mieczysław Połukard Criterium of Polish Speedway League Aces was the 1988 version of the Mieczysław Połukard Criterium of Polish Speedway Leagues Aces. It took place on March 27 in the Polonia Stadium in Bydgoszcz, Poland.

Starting positions draw 

 Marek Ziarnik - Polonia Bydgoszcz
 Wojciech Żabiałowicz - Apator Toruń
 Jacek Woźniak - Polonia Bydgoszcz
 Janusz Stachyra - Stal Rzeszów
 Ryszard Dołomisiewicz - Polonia Bydgoszcz
 Ryszard Franczyszyn - Stal Gorzów Wlkp.
 Andrzej Huszcza - Falubaz Zielona Góra
 Piotr Świst - Stal Gorzów Wlkp.
 Jacek Brucheiser - Ostrovia Ostrów Wlkp.
 Krzysztof Ziarnik - Polonia Bydgoszcz
 Grzegorz Śniegowski - Start Gniezno
 Sławomir Drabik - Włókniarz Częstochowa
 Wojciech Załuski - Kolejarz Opole
 Eugeniusz Skupień - ROW Rybnik
 Marek Kępa - Motor Lublin
 Mirosław Korbel - ROW Rybnik
 (R1) Piotr Glücklich - Polonia Bydgoszcz
 (R2) Adamczak - Polonia Bydgoszcz

Heat details

Sources 
 Roman Lach - Polish Speedway Almanac

See also 

Mieczyslaw Polukard
Mieczyslaw Polukard
Mieczysław Połukard Criterium of Polish Speedway Leagues Aces
March 1988 sports events in Europe